Serengdongrub (17 February 1894 – 2 August 1980) was an Inner Mongolian politician in the Republic of China. An ethnic Mongol, he was a native of Harqin Middle Banner (today Ningcheng County, Chifeng).

Names
In the Mongolian Cyrillic alphabet, it is written Сэрэндонров (Serendonrov). He used the Chinese name Pai Yün-t'i, and the courtesy name Chü Ch'uan. Some scholars read his Chinese name as a transcription of another Mongolian name Buyantai (meaning "meritorious", in Cyrillic Буянтай), and conflate references to Serengdongrub and Buyantai; however, as Christopher Atwood points, Buyantai (布彦泰) was actually another Harqin Mongol, whose Chinese name was Yu Lanzhai or Yu Lanze (??择).

Career
In 1912, he entered the Mongolian and Tibetan School at Beijing under Gungsangnorbu. Afterwards he joined the Kuomintang. In 1925, he was one of the founders of the Inner Mongolian People's Revolutionary Party, along with Merse. In 1934, he became a member of the Mongol Local Autonomy Political Affairs Committee. From 1948 to 1949 he served as head of the Mongolian and Tibetan Affairs Commission. He retreated to Taiwan with the KMT, and died there in 1980.

References

Bibliography

Further reading
; however, note that  warns against reliance on this entry due to "massive errors of fact and interpretation", including the name under which it is filed.

1894 births
1980 deaths
Republic of China politicians from Inner Mongolia
Chinese people of Mongolian descent
Members of the Kuomintang
People from Chifeng
Taiwanese people from Inner Mongolia
Taiwanese people of Mongolian descent